Jacob ben Reuben may refer to:

Jacob ben Reuben (Karaite), 11th-century Karaite scholar, probably from Constantinople
Jacob ben Reuben (rabbi), author of a polemical work against Christianity
Jacob ben Reuben ibn Zur, 18th-century Moroccan rabbi